The Daily Pakistan is a daily newspaper in Pakistan, published both in Urdu language and in English. Mujeeb-ur-Rehman Shami is its chief editor. 

Daily Pakistan is currently published from Lahore, Karachi, Islamabad, Multan and Peshawar simultaneously.

History
This Lahore-based daily was started in December 1997 by Akbar Ali Bhatti. This was the first newspaper of Pakistan that came in a colored form. He suffered hardships and was put behind the bars due to some clashes with the government during the time. The newspaper was then handed over to Mujeeb ur Rehman Shami. Prior to taking over Daily Pakistan, he was Editor-in-Chief of the Weekly Zindagi, Lahore. Mujeeb also served as President, Council of Pakistan Newspaper Editors (CPNE) in 2002.

Notable columnists 
 Mujeeb-ur-Rehman Shami (Jalsa-e-Aam) (Chief editor of Daily Pakistan)
 Noman Nayyir Kulachvi (Sirat-e-Danish) 
Isar Rana (Group Editor Daily Pakistan)
Anique Butt (Sabz-Bagh) 
Shahid Malik (Kush-Kalami)
QudartUllah Chaudry (Ye Lahore Hy)
Mohsin Goraya (Surkh-Fita) 
Mustafa Kamaal Pasha (Current Affair)
Naseem Shahid (Ankahi)

See also 
 List of newspapers in Pakistan

References

External links 
 Daily Pakistan (Urdu version) Homepage
 Daily Pakistan (English version) Homepage

1997 establishments in Pakistan
Companies based in Lahore
Daily newspapers published in Pakistan
Publishing companies established in 1997
Urdu-language newspapers published in Pakistan
English-language newspapers published in Pakistan